Mezlageh-ye Soflá (also Romanized as Mezlāgeh-ye Soflá; also known as Mazlāgeh, Meslāgeh, Mezlāgeh, Mezlāgeh-ye Pā’īn, and Muzlāgiā) is a village in Abdoliyeh-ye Gharbi Rural District, in the Central District of Ramshir County, Khuzestan Province, Iran. At the 2006 census, its population was 26, in 5 families.

References 

Populated places in Ramshir County